Star is the third studio album from American R&B group 702. It was released by Motown on November 19, 2002 in the United States. The album peaked at number forty-five on the US Billboard 200 and produced the singles “Star” and "I Still Love You".

Critical reception

Andy Kellman of Allmusic rated the album two and a half stars out of five and gave the work a rather dismissive review, stating that "it continues in the group's tradition of being able to deliver a couple of solid singles surrounded by middling to fair album tracks." PopMatters thought the album was dated and "trapped in a time warp" and that "It wants to be pre- Mary J. Blige hip-hop and R&B with some notable exceptions". Overall, they praised both Mario Winans and the Neptunes contributions to the album, and felt they managed "to create some haphazard hits here, lack of creativity aside". Sal Cinquemani from Slant Magazine was mixed in his review. Cinquemani praised the albums first half of material, while disapproving of the second half calling it "a bit less successful". Nonetheless, he declared, "702 comes closest to capturing the buttery warm harmonies of Diana Ross and the Supremes—Destiny’s Child be damned. Star exists to prove that surprises can indeed be pleasant".

Chart performance
The album peaked at forty-five on the US Billboard 200 and reached the twenty-second spot on the Top R&B/Hip-Hop Albums chart.

Track listing

Notes
  denotes co-producer

Personnel
Information taken from Allmusic.
a&r – Nina Freeman, Kedar Massenburg, Shante Paige, Marsha Reid
arranging – Ted Bishop
art direction – Chris Kornmann
assistant – Vincent Alexander, Mike Butler, Vadim Chislov, Stephen Glicken, Dion Peters, Alexis Seton, Rich Tapper, Javier Valverde, Jeff Vereb, Artese Williams
composing – R. Bell, G. Brown, J.J. Jackson, L. Jackson, P.J. Jackson, E. Jordan, S.K. Russell, Mario Winans
creative direction – Sandy Brummels
design – Chris Kornmann
drums – Pharrell Williams
engineering – Wayne Allison, Ted Bishop, Ben Briggs, Dru Castro, Andrew Coleman, Larry Ferguson, Eliud "Lou" Ortiz, Hernán Santiago, Mike Tocci, Darren Venbitti
executive production – Kedar Massenburg, Shante Paige, Todd Russaw
guitar – Greg Charley
instrumentation – Charles Farrar
keyboards – Ted Bishop, Dave Hunter, Tevin Thomas
mastering – Chris Gehringer
mixing – Ben Arrindell, Kevin "KD" Davis, Duro, Larry Ferguson, Rich Keller, Phil Tan
photography – Albert Sanchez
production – Ted Bishop, Mike City, Charles Farrar, Mario Winans
programming – Ted Bishop, Charles Farrar, Pharrell Williams
rapping – Clipse
vocals – 702, Pharrell Williams

Charts

References

External links
 

2002 albums
702 (group) albums
Albums produced by the Neptunes
Motown albums